The following is an incomplete list of middle schools in Alaska:

Anchorage School District, Anchorage/Eagle River
Central Middle School of Science
Goldenview Middle School
Gruening Middle School
Hanshew Middle School
Mears Middle School
Mirror Lake Middle School
Nicholas J. Begich Middle School
Orah Dee Clark Middle School
Polaris K-12 School
Palmer junior middle school Palmer alaska
Steller Secondary School
Wendler Middle School
Annette Island School District, Metlakatla
Charles R. Leask Sr. Middle School
Bristol Bay Borough School District, King Salmon/Naknek/South Naknek
Bristol Bay Middle/High School
Copper River School District, Glennallen
Glennallen Jr./Sr. High School
Cordova City School District, Cordova
Cordova Jr/Sr High School
Craig City School District, Craig
Craig Middle School
Dillingham City School District, Dillingham
Dillingham Middle/High School
Fairbanks North Star Borough School District, Eielson AFB/Fairbanks/North Pole
Ben Eielson Jr./Sr. High School
James C. Ryan Middle School
North Pole Middle School
Randy Smith Middle School
Tanana Middle School
Galena City School District, Galena
Sidney C. Huntington Jr./Sr. High School
Hoonah City School District, Hoonah
Hoonah Jr./Sr. High School
Juneau School District, Juneau
Dzantik'i Heeni Middle School
Floyd Dryden Middle School
Kenai Peninsula Borough School District, Homer/Kenai/Nikiski/Seward/Soldotna
Homer Middle School
Kenai Middle School
Nikiski Middle/Senior High School
Seward Middle School
Soldotna Middle School
Ketchikan Gateway Borough School District, Ketchikan
Revilla Jr./Sr. High School
Schoenbar Middle School
Kodiak Island Borough School District, Kodiak
Kodiak Middle School
Kuspuk School District, Aniak
Aniak Jr./Sr. High School
Sitka School District, Sitka
Blatchley Middle School

References

Middle School
Middle
 
Alaska